The Planika Lodge at Triglav (2401 m) is a mountain hut, which lies on the Ledine plains on the southern side of Mount Triglav. The First hut, also called the Triglav Tempe, was built on 18 September 1871. In 1877, the Austro-German hiking club built a hut called the Maria Theresa Hut. On 13 August 1911, there was another building added called the Maria Theresa Lodge. After World War I, the Slovenian Hiking club took over the hut and renamed it the Aleksander Lodge. The hut was transformed to a border garrison  for a while. In 1945, the Gorje Hiking Club renamed it to Planika Lodge at Triglav. In 1987,  was demolished and a bigger annex was built at its place on 19 August 1992.

Starting points 
 5½ h: from the Metalworker's Lodge in the Krma Valley (870 m), over Horse Saddle
 2 h: from the Tarvisio Lodge at Dolič (2,151 m)
 2 h: from the Vodnik Lodge at Big Field Pasture (1,817 m)

Neighbouring huts 
 1 h: to Triglav Lodge at Kredarica (2,515 m)

Neighbouring mountains 
 1½ h: Triglav (2,864 m), over Little Mount Triglav (2,725 m)
 1½ h: Triglav (2,864 m), over Triglav Notch Saddle (2,659 m)

See also 
 Slovenian Mountain Hiking Trail

References
 Slovenska planinska pot, Planinski vodnik, PZS, 2012, Milenko Arnejšek, Andraž Poljanec

External links 

 Dom Planika on Hribi.net
 on www.pzs.si

Mountain huts in Slovenia